Morigaon Law College is a government law school situated at Sonari Gaon, Morigaon, Morigaon district in the Indian state of Assam. It offers undergraduate 3 years LL.B and 1 year LL.M . course affiliated to Gauhati University. This College was established in 1964 and the course are recognised by Bar Council of India (BCI), New Delhi.

Morigaon Law College offers a 3-year LLB program, which is recognized by the Bar Council of India. The college also offers a 2-year LLM program, which is affiliated with Gauhati University.

References 

Law schools in Assam
Educational institutions established in 1964
1964 establishments in Assam
Colleges affiliated to Gauhati University